Lord Babs is a comedy play by the British writer Keble Howard. A farce, the plot revolves around an aristocrat who has to pretend he is a small child in order to avoid being arrested.

It premiered at the Kings Theatre, Southsea in Hampshire in 1925. Donald Calthrop, the actor engaged to play the lead, had to withdraw at short notice due to illness. Keble Howard, the play's author and an amateur actor, stood in for the first two nights at Southsea while another professional actor prepared for the part. After Southsea, the play performed for a week each in Cardiff and Brighton, followed by two dates in North Wales.

Three years later it enjoyed a run of 142 performances in London's West End between 26 January and 19 June 1928, initially at the Vaudeville Theatre before transferring to the Criterion Theatre. The West End cast included Billy Merson, Hermione Baddeley, Lawrence Anderson and Joan Barry.

Film adaptation
In 1932 it was adapted into a film of the same title directed by Walter Forde and starring Bobby Howes, Jean Colin and Alfred Drayton.

References

Bibliography
 
 

1925 plays
British plays adapted into films
West End plays
Comedy plays